Fissicrambus quadrinotellus is a moth in the family Crambidae. It was described by Zeller in 1877. It is found in Panama and North America, where it has been recorded from Florida and Texas.

The wingspan is about 20 mm. Adults have been recorded on wing from April to May, August to September and in December in the southern United States.

References

Crambini
Moths described in 1877
Moths of North America